The governor-general of Saint Vincent and the Grenadines is the representative of the Vincentian monarch, in Saint Vincent and the Grenadines.

The office of the governor-general was created in 1979 when the islands gained independence as a Commonwealth realm.

List of governors-general of Saint Vincent and the Grenadines
Following is a list of people who have served as governor-general of Saint Vincent and the Grenadines since independence in 1979.

Symbols
 Died in office.

See also

 List of prime ministers of Saint Vincent and the Grenadines
 List of colonial governors and administrators of Saint Vincent

References

 World Statesmen

Saint Vincent and the Grenadines, Governors-General
Government of Saint Vincent and the Grenadines
 
Governors-General
Saint Vincent and the Grenadines and the Commonwealth of Nations
1979 establishments in Saint Vincent and the Grenadines